PP-276 Muzaffargarh-V is a Constituency of  Provincial Assembly of Punjab.

See also
 PP-275 Muzaffargarh-IV
 PP-277 Muzaffargarh-VI

References

External links
 Election commission Pakistan's official website
 Awazoday.com check result
 Official Website of Government of Punjab

Provincial constituencies of Punjab, Pakistan
PP-258

Constituencies of Muzaffargarh
Politics of Muzaffargarh
Constituencies of Pakistan